Lawrence Sawyer, Baron Sawyer (born 12 May 1943), known as Tom Sawyer, is a British trade unionist and Labour Party politician. He was General Secretary of the Labour Party from 1994 to 1998.

Early life
Sawyer was educated at Dodmire School, Eastbourne Comprehensive School and Darlington Technical College.

Career

Trade unions
Aged fifteen, Sawyer went to work on the factory floor of a Durham engineering works.  He became a National Union of Public Employees (NUPE) Officer in 1971, becoming their Northern Regional Officer in 1975.
In 1981, he was made Deputy General Secretary of NUPE and served through its merger to become UNISON until 1994.

The Labour Party
In his NUPE role he served as a National Executive Committee Member of the Labour Party between 1981 and 1994 and was elected to serve as its Chair from 1990 to 1991.

In 1994, Sawyer became General Secretary of the Labour Party and led the Party successfully into the 1997 General Election. He was a moderniser who helped bring about the New Labour era. He stood down at the 1998 Party Conference and was created a Life Peer as Baron Sawyer, of Darlington in the County of Durham on 4 August 1998. He is now a director of several companies and public sector bodies.  

The Labour History Archive and Study Centre at the People's History Museum in Manchester holds the papers of Sawyer, which range from 1985 to 1998.

Other Positions
In 2005, Lord Sawyer became the chancellor of the University of Teesside, replacing former Conservative MP and member of the European Commission, Leon Brittan.  Sawyer served in this role until 2017.

Sawyer has been a life-long admire of William Morris, the socialist writer and craftsman and in 2018 Sawyer began a five year term of office as President of the William Morris Society.

References

External links
Announcement of his introduction at the House of Lords House of Lords minutes of proceedings, 14 October 1998

Sawyer, Tom
Sawyer, Tom Sawyer Baron
Sawyer, Tom
Sawyer, Tom
Sawyer, Tom
Chairs of the Labour Party (UK)
Life peers created by Elizabeth II